Frederick Henry Todd (20 August 1903 – 6 January 1992) was a British naval architect, a member of the United States National Academy of Engineering, and a recipient of Gibbs Brothers Medal from the U.S. National Academy of Sciences.

Todd was born in Newcastle upon Tyne, United Kingdom in 1903. He graduated with B.S. degree in naval architecture in 1925 and received his PhD in 1931 from Kings College, Durham University in England.

References 

1903 births
1992 deaths
Engineers from Tyne and Wear
British naval architects
People from Newcastle upon Tyne
Members of the United States National Academy of Engineering
Alumni of King's College, Newcastle